is a Japanese former footballer.

Career statistics

Club

Notes

References

1990 births
Living people
People from Shinagawa
Association football people from Tokyo
Japanese footballers
Association football defenders
Japan Soccer College players
Albirex Niigata Singapore FC players
ReinMeer Aomori players
Singapore Premier League players
Japan Football League players
Japanese expatriate sportspeople in Singapore
Expatriate footballers in Singapore